Scenedra decoratalis is a moth of the family Pyralidae. It is found in Australia.

References

Moths of Australia
Moths described in 1866
Pyralini